The Midway Plantation House and Outbuildings are a set of historic buildings constructed in the mid-19th century in present-day Knightdale, Wake County, North Carolina, as part of a forced-labor farm.

It was built by  Charles Lewis Hinton, a farmer, enslaver, and state treasurer, as a wedding gift for his son, David, and daughter-in-law, Mary Boddie Carr (sister of Governor Elias Carr). David and Mary's daughter, the anti-suffragist Mary Hilliard Hinton, was born here. It was named for its position halfway between two other Hinton family properties: Beaver Dam and The Oaks.

Other structures on the site included a carriage house, kitchen, smokehouse, potato house, well house, ice house, cotton gin, loom house, doll house, office, school, two stables, and several slave quarters.  Of these, only the kitchen, school, office, and carriage and doll houses remain.

The move and Hinton family history are documented by Hinton descendant and film critic Godfrey Cheshire in Moving Midway (2007).

It was listed on the National Register of Historic Places in 2007.

See also
 List of Registered Historical Places in North Carolina
 National Register of Historic Places listings in Wake County, North Carolina

References

Plantation houses in North Carolina
Houses on the National Register of Historic Places in North Carolina
Greek Revival houses in North Carolina
Houses completed in 1848
Houses in Wake County, North Carolina
National Register of Historic Places in Wake County, North Carolina
Cotton plantations in the United States
Slave cabins and quarters in the United States